The 1965 ECAC Hockey Men's Ice Hockey Tournament was the 4th tournament in league history. It was played between March 9 and March 13, 1965. Quarterfinal games were played at home team campus sites, while the 'final four' games were played at the Boston Arena in Boston, Massachusetts. By reaching the championship game both, Boston College and Brown received invitations to participate in the 1965 NCAA University Division Men's Ice Hockey Tournament.

Format
The tournament featured three rounds of play, all of which were single-elimination. The top eight teams, based on conference rankings, qualified to participate in the tournament. In the quarterfinals the first seed and eighth seed, the second seed and seventh seed, the third seed and sixth seed and the fourth seed and fifth seed played against one another. In the semifinals, the winner of the first and eighth matchup played the winner of the fourth and fifth matchup while the other two remaining teams played with the winners advancing to the championship game and the losers advancing to the third place game.

Conference standings
Note: GP = Games played; W = Wins; L = Losses; T = Ties; Pct. = Winning percentage; GF = Goals for; GA = Goals against

Bracket

Note: * denotes overtime period(s)

Quarterfinals

(1) Boston University vs. (8) Providence

(2) Boston College vs. (7) Dartmouth

(3) Clarkson vs. (6) Northeastern

(4) Brown vs. (5) Cornell

Semifinals

(1) Boston University vs. (4) Brown

(2) Boston College vs. (3) Clarkson

Third Place

(1) Boston University vs. (3) Clarkson

Championship

(2) Boston College vs. (4) Brown

Tournament awards

All-Tournament Team

First Team
F Phil Dyer (Boston College)
F Fred Bassi (Boston University)
F John Cunniff (Boston College)
D Ralph Toran (Boston College)
D Tom Ross (Boston University)
G Terry Yurkiewicz (Clarkson)
* Most Outstanding Player(s)

Second Team
F Terry Chapman (Brown)
F Bruce Fennie (Boston University)
F Pete Flaherty (Boston College)
D Don Eccelston (Brown)
D Gary Patterson (Clarkson)
G Pat Murphy* (Boston College)

References

External links
ECAC Hockey
1964–65 ECAC Hockey Standings
1964–65 NCAA Standings

ECAC Hockey Men's Ice Hockey Tournament
ECAC tournament